The Harris Mill, also known as the Interlaken Mills, is a historic mill complex at 618 Main Street in the Harris village of Coventry, Rhode Island.  This complex of ten buildings occupies a  parcel adjacent to the North Branch of the Pawtuxet River.  The oldest portion of the main mill building dates to 1850, with a major expansion added in 1870.  The mill was founded by Elisha Harris, who had recently served as Governor of Rhode Island, and produced cotton twill cloth.  It was acquired by Interlaken Mills in 1900, for whom it had been a major supplier, and was operated until 1953. In 2014, the long abandoned mill was restored and renovated into an apartment complex.

The mill was listed on the National Register of Historic Places in 2007.

See also
National Register of Historic Places listings in Kent County, Rhode Island

References

Industrial buildings and structures on the National Register of Historic Places in Rhode Island
Industrial buildings completed in 1850
Buildings and structures in Coventry, Rhode Island
National Register of Historic Places in Kent County, Rhode Island